USNS Coastal Crusader (AK-220/ORV-16/T-AGM-16/AGS-36) was an  that was constructed for the US Navy during the closing period of World War II.  She was later acquired by the US Army in 1946 and the US Air Force in 1957 before being reacquired by the USN in 1964 and as a missile range instrumentation ship.

Construction
Coastal Crusader, a C1-M-AV1  cargo vessel, was laid down under a US Maritime Commission (MARCOM) contract, MC hull 2174, on 12 April 1945 at Sturgeon Bay, Wisconsin, by the Leathem D. Smith Shipbuilding Company; launched on 24 June 1945; sponsored by Mrs. DeForrest Colburn; and completed on 26 July 1945.

On 25 February 1945, the Navy had assigned the name Wexford and the designation AK-220 to the projected ship; but the contract for her acquisition by the Navy was cancelled in August 1945 because of the cessation of hostilities in the Pacific Ocean and the surrender of Japan. Coastal Crusader thus entered mercantile service, never having borne the name Wexford.

US Army service
The vessel was placed in service 30 August 1946, by the US Army Transportation Service as USAT Private Joe R. Hastings. She was returned to the Reserve Fleet on 27 October 1949.

US Air Force service
Renamed Coastal Sentry, she was acquired by the US Air Force on 13 March 1957, which redesignated her an Ocean Range Vessel, USAFS Coastal Crusader (ORV-16). She operated on the Air Force's Eastern Test Range during the late 1950s and early 1960s.

US Navy service
The US Navy acquired Coastal Crusader from the Air Force in 1964, a placed her in service with the Military Sea Transportation Service (MSTS) and redesignated her a Missile Range Instrumentation Ship, USNS Coastal Crusader (T-AGM-16). Navy records indicate Coastal Crusader was redesignated as a Survey Ship, Coastal Crusader (AGS-36) in 1969, and finally struck from the Navy List on 30 April 1976.

Inactivation 
Coastal Crusader was subsequently sold by the Maritime Administration (MARAD) on 12 April 1977. She was scrapped later that year.

Notes 

Citations

Bibliography 

Online resources

External links

 

Alamosa-class cargo ships
Ships built in Sturgeon Bay, Wisconsin
1945 ships
World War II merchant ships of the United States
Type C1-M ships of the United States Air Force
Type C1-M ships of the United States Navy
Cold War auxiliary ships of the United States
Signals intelligence
Missile range instrumentation ships of the United States Navy
Research vessels of the United States Navy